Fenais may refer to the following places in Portugal:

Fenais da Ajuda, civil parish in the municipality of Ribeira Grande
Fenais da Luz, civil parish in the municipality of Ponta Delgada